Brit Awards 2020  was the 40th edition of the British Phonographic Industry's annual pop music show, the Brit Awards, and was marketed as "The 40th Show". It was held on 18 February 2020 at the O2 Arena in London, with Jack Whitehall as the host for the third year running.	
 
BBC Radio 1 host Alice Levine hosted the BRITs Are Coming Nominations Launch Show on 11 January 2020. The show was broadcast on ITV.

Category changes
Several changes were made to the award categories compared to the previous year with the overal number of awards based on nominations reduced from from thirteen to nine. None of the categories included fan voting.

Categories not included
Compared to 2019, the following awards were not awarded:
International Group Award (Returned in 2021)
Best British Video Award
Outstanding Contribution to Music Award
Global Success Award

Renamed categories
The following awards were renamed:
Best New Artist (previously British Breakthrough Act)
Rising Star Award (previously Critics' Choice Award)
Song of the Year (previously British Single of the Year)

Controversy
Following the launch show, the Brits were castigated for having male-dominated nominations on the main and gender-neutral categories. The nominations for Album of the Year, Best Group and Best New Artist were almost entirely dominated by male solo artists, except for Mabel who was nominated for the latter, and international singers Normani and Miley Cyrus, who both were up for Song of the Year for their collaborations with Sam Smith and Mark Ronson.

Performers

Pre-ceremony

Main show

Winners and nominees
The winners are in bold.

Multiple nominations and awards

References

External links
Brit Awards official website

Brit Awards
Brit Awards
Brit
February 2020 events in the United Kingdom
2020 awards in the United Kingdom